Zoran Jerin (13 February 1925 – 6 February 2005) was a Slovene journalist, writer and editor.

He won the Levstik Award in 1978 for his book Himalaja, rad te imam  (Himalayas, I Love You) published after an expedition to the Himalayas in 1975, one of a total of seven journeys he made to Nepal and India.

Published works 

 Himalaja, rad te imam  (Himalayas, I Love You), 1978
 Vzhodno od Katmanduja (West of Kathmandu), 1965

References

1925 births
2005 deaths
Slovenian journalists
Levstik Award laureates
Writers from Celje
20th-century journalists